Tan Sri Datuk Seri Panglima Bernard Giluk Dompok (born 7 October 1949) is a Malaysian politician who served as Ambassador of Malaysia to the Holy See from March 2016 to June 2018, Minister of Plantation Industries and Commodities from April 2009 to May 2013, Minister in the Prime Minister's Department from December 1999 to April 2009, 11th Chief Minister of Sabah briefly from May 1998 to March 1999, Member of Parliament (MP) for Penampang from August 1986 to April 1995 and again from March 2008 to May 2013 and Ranau from November 1999 to March 2004 as well as President of the United Pasokmomogun Kadazandusun Murut Organisation (UPKO) from 1994 to 2014.

Early life 
He was born in Penampang, Sabah, and received his education in SM St. Michael, Penampang and SM La Salle, Tanjung Aru. Later he obtained a Bachelor of Science degree from the University of East London. He is also a Fellow of the Royal Institution of Chartered Surveyors (RICS) and Fellow of the Royal Institution of Surveyors Malaysia (RISM)

Career 
He started his career as a valuer at the Sabah Lands & Surveys Department in 1978. Then he left the public sector and worked as a private valuer for about five years from 1980 until 1985.

Political career 
Initially a member of the United Sabah Party (PBS), Dompok contested, and won, both the Sabah State Legislative Assembly seat of Moyog, and the federal seat of Penampang, in separate 1986 elections. PBS won a majority in the state assembly at the election, and Dompok was appointed the state's finance minister.

He became the President of the UPKO, then known as the Sabah Democratic Party (PDS), in 1994. The party was formed when Dompok and others split from the PBS to join the Barisan Nasional (BN) coalition and deliver the coalition a majority in the Sabah State Legislative Assembly. After switching to the Barisan Nasional, he lost his parliamentary seat at the 1995 election to a PBS candidate.

Despite losing his federal seat, Dompok remained a state assemblyman and a senior member of the Barisan Nasional state government that he had helped to form. He served in a range of ministries in the state government, before assuming the post of Chief Minister, on a rotating basis, from 1998 to 1999. In 1999 he won the federal parliamentary seat of Kinabalu, defeating a PBS candidate. In 2004, he joined the Federal Cabinet as Minister in the Prime Minister's Department and in 2008, he became Minister of Plantation Industries and Commodities. His federal parliamentary career ended at the 2013 election, when he lost his parliamentary seat to Darell Leiking of the People's Justice Party (PKR).

Diplomatic career 
Bernard was recalled from his posting following the Pakatan Harapan (PH) government's decision to stop the previous practice adopted by the Barisan Nasional (BN) of appointing politicians to head overseas missions.

Election results

Family 
He is currently married to Puan Sri Diana Alip and the couple have five children in total (four from his current marriage and one from a previous marriage).

Honours 
  :
  Medal of the Order of the Defender of the Realm (PPN) (1976)
  Commander of the Order of Loyalty to the Crown of Malaysia (PSM) - Tan Sri (1997)

  :
  Commander of the Order of Kinabalu (PGDK) - Datuk (1987)
  Grand Commander of the Order of Kinabalu (SPDK) - Datuk Seri Panglima (1995)

See also 
 Penampang (federal constituency)

References 

|-

Government ministers of Malaysia
1949 births
Chief Ministers of Sabah
Sabah state ministers
Living people
Kadazan-Dusun people
Ambassadors of Malaysia to the Holy See
United Progressive Kinabalu Organisation politicians
United Sabah Party politicians
Alumni of the University of East London
Malaysian political party founders
Members of the Sabah State Legislative Assembly
Members of the Dewan Rakyat
Medallists of the Order of the Defender of the Realm
Commanders of the Order of Loyalty to the Crown of Malaysia
Grand Commanders of the Order of Kinabalu
Commanders of the Order of Kinabalu